Hot Fuzz is a 2007 action comedy film directed by Edgar Wright and written by Wright and Simon Pegg. Starring Pegg, Nick Frost, Timothy Dalton, and Jim Broadbent, the film centres on two police officers investigating a series of mysterious and gruesome deaths in a West Country village. It is the second and most successful film in the Three Flavours Cornetto trilogy, succeeding Shaun of the Dead (2004) and followed by The World's End (2013).

Over 100 action films were used as inspiration for developing the script. Principal photography took place in Wells, Somerset for eleven weeks. Ten artists worked on visual effects, which involved explosions, gore and gunfire scenes. The film opened on 16 February 2007 in the United Kingdom and 20 April in the United States to box office success, grossing US$80 million worldwide against a budget of $12–16 million. Hot Fuzz received critical acclaim. In 2020, Empire named it the 67th greatest film of the 21st century.

Plot

PC Nicholas Angel, a high-achieving Metropolitan Police officer, is promoted to Sergeant, but his resentful colleagues arrange for him to be reassigned to the small rural town of Sandford, Gloucestershire, a regular "Village of the Year" winner. Angel is soon frustrated by the mundanity of the village, his lazy and incompetent colleagues, and local police and Neighbourhood Watch Alliance (NWA) commitment to low crime statistics rather than law enforcement. His partner, PC Danny Butterman, who he arrested for drink-driving, is a fan of buddy cop films and the son of Inspector Frank Butterman, Angel's superior.

Martin Blower and Eve Draper, the two lead actors of an am-dram production of Romeo and Juliet, whom Angel had pulled over for speeding, are murdered by a cloaked axe-wielding figure, who stages it as a car accident. Angel is the only officer who suspects foul play. Sent to resolve a small dispute, Angel discovers an illegal weapons stash, including an old sea mine, and confiscates it. Angel warms to Danny, and they binge-watch action movies at Danny's home. That night, wealthy land developer George Merchant is attacked in his home by a cloaked figure and killed in a deliberate gas explosion.

Angel suspects that the killings are connected to a recent property deal. A local journalist, Tim Messenger, approaches Angel at a village fete, claiming to have information, but a cloaked figure dislodges masonry atop the church's tower, which falls and kills Messenger. Whilst buying Danny a late birthday gift, Angel learns from Leslie Tiller, the village florist, about her plans to sell her land to Merchant's business partners. While Angel retrieves his notebook, she is stabbed in the neck with her garden shears; Angel gives chase but loses the killer. Angel suspects Simon Skinner, a supermarket manager, as the property deal would have built a rival supermarket, but Skinner has an alibi.

After surmising that there may be multiple killers, Angel is attacked in his hotel room by one of Skinner's employees, Michael "Lurch" Armstrong. Angel knocks him out and learns of a secret NWA meeting at Sandford Castle. Angel confronts the NWA, led by Frank, who reveals that they committed the murders, staged as accidents, for various petty reasons as each victim threatened Sandford's chances of winning Village of the Year. Frank's motive is his late wife Irene; she put everything into helping Sandford win the first "Village of the Year", but travellers ruined their chances the night before the judges arrived, driving her to suicide. Angel flees and falls into the castle's catacombs, where he finds the corpses of the NWA's other victims. Danny appears and fakes killing Angel. Pretending to dispose of the body, Danny drives Angel away and urges him to return to London for his own safety. At a petrol station, Angel sees a rack of the films he and Danny bonded over and decides to return to Sandford.

Angel arms himself with the confiscated guns, then he and Danny engage in a shootout with the NWA. When Frank orders the other officers to arrest them, Angel and Danny convince them that Frank is the culprit. Frank flees and the officers besiege the supermarket, with Skinner fleeing in a car with Frank. Angel corners Skinner at Sandford's model village, and after a brief fight Skinner is impaled through the jaw by a miniature church steeple. Frank attempts to escape in Angel's car but is attacked by a missing swan that Angel and Danny had recaptured earlier.

Angel's former superiors arrive and ask him to return to London, as the crime rate has risen heavily in his absence, but Angel decides to remain in Sandford. While the Sandford Police are going over the paperwork of the arrests, the elderly Tom Weaver, the last NWA member, bursts into the station wielding a blunderbuss. He shoots at Angel, but Danny jumps in front. In the resulting struggle, Weaver accidentally activates the sea mine, killing himself and destroying the station.

One year later, Angel has been promoted to Inspector and head of the Sandford police, and Danny is Sergeant. After visiting Irene's grave, the two drive off to their next crime scene.

Cast

Production

Development
Director Edgar Wright wanted to write and direct a cop film because "there isn't really any tradition of cop films in the UK... We felt that every other country in the world had its own tradition of great cop action films and we had none." Wright and Pegg spent eighteen months writing the script. The first draft took eight months to develop, and after watching 138 cop-related films for dialogue and plot ideas and conducting over fifty interviews with police officers for research, the script was completed after another nine months. The title was based on the various two-word titles of action films in the 1980s and 1990s. In one interview Wright declared that he "wanted to make a title that really had very little meaning... like Lethal Weapon and Point Break and Executive Decision." In the same interview, Pegg joked that many action films' titles "seem to be generated from two hats filled with adjectives and nouns and you just, 'Okay, that'll do.'"  While writing the script, Wright, as well as Pegg, intended to include Frost as the partner for Pegg's character. Frost revealed that he would do the film only if he could name his character, and he chose "Danny Butterman".

Preparation and filming

During the latter half of 2005, Working Title Films approached several towns in South West England looking for an appropriate filming location. Pegg commented, "We're both [Pegg and Wright] from the West Country so it just seemed like it was the perfect and logical thing to drag those kind of ideas and those genres and those clichés back to our beginnings to where we grew up, so you could see high-octane balls-to-the-wall action in Frome". Stow-on-the-Wold was considered amongst others, but after being turned away, the company settled upon Wells in Somerset, Wright's hometown, of which he has said "I love it but I also want to trash it". Wells Cathedral was digitally painted out of every shot of the cathedral city, as Wright wanted the Church of St Cuthbert to be the centre building for the fictional town of Sandford; however, the Bishop's Palace is identifiable in some shots (and was itself used as the setting for some scenes). While shooting scenes in their uniforms, Pegg and Frost were often mistaken for genuine police officers and asked for directions by passers-by. Filming also took place at the Hendon Police College, including the driving school skid pan and athletic track and at the Metropolitan Police Specialist Training Centre at Gravesend. Next to Hendon is Mill Hill where Finchley Nurseries is located which is where the flower shop scene was filmed. The final scenes were filmed at the surviving ruins of Waverley Abbey. Filming commenced on 19 March 2006 and lasted for eleven weeks. After editing, Wright ended up cutting half an hour of footage from the film.

Outside references

Self-references
Wright has said that Hot Fuzz takes elements from his final amateur film, Dead Right, which he described as both "Lethal Weapon set in Somerset" and "a Dirty Harry film in Somerset". He uses some of the same locations in both films, including the Somerfield supermarket, where he used to work as a shelf-stacker.

References to Shaun of the Dead are also present in the film. In one scene, Nicholas wants to chase a shoplifter by jumping over several garden fences; however, Danny is reluctant. Nicholas says, "What's the matter, Danny? You never taken a shortcut before?" He smiles assuredly before jumping over four in a row (according to the DVD commentary, Pegg vaulted over three fences, and a stunt man did a back flip over the fourth). When Danny attempts it, he trips and falls through the fence. This is almost identical to a scene in Shaun of the Dead, including the fall-through-fence gag, albeit with the pratfalling role reverse: in Shaun of the Dead it happens to Pegg's character rather than Frost's, and he falls over the fence rather than through it. The DVD commentary says that Frost purposely looked back at the camera after crashing through the fence, to show that he had done the stunt rather than someone else.

Frost's characters (Danny in Hot Fuzz, Ed in Shaun of the Dead) have a liking for Cornetto ice cream. Pegg and Wright have referred to Hot Fuzz as being the second film in the "Three Flavours Cornetto trilogy", with Shaun of the Dead being the first and The World's End being the third.

Other films
Various scenes in Hot Fuzz feature a variety of action film DVDs such as Police Story 3: Super Cop and scenes from Point Break and Bad Boys II. Wright revealed that he had to get permission from every actor in each video clip, including stunt men, to use the clips and for the use of the DVD covers had to pay for the rights from the respective studios. The film parodies clichés used in other action movies. On the topic of perceived gun fetishes in these movies, Pegg has said, "Men can't do that thing, which is the greatest achievement of humankind, which is to make another human, so we make metal versions of our own penises and fire more bits of metal out of the end into people's heads... It's our turn to grab the gun by the hilt and fire it into your face." Despite this, Pegg maintains that the film is not a spoof, in that "They lack the sneer that a lot of parodies have that look down on their source material. Because we're looking up to it." The film also includes various references to The Wicker Man, in which Edward Woodward had played a policeman tough on law and order.

Special effects
To illustrate the destruction of the mansion as a result of the gas explosion, gas mortars were placed in front of the building to create large-scale fireballs. The wave of fire engulfs the camera, and to achieve that effect, gas mortars were used again but were fired upwards into a black ceiling piece that sloped up towards the camera. When the sequence was shot at a high speed, the flames appeared to surge across the ground. For one of the final scenes of the film, the Sandford police station is destroyed by an explosion. Part of the explosion was created by using a set model that showed its windows being blown out, while the building remained intact. The actual destruction of the building was depicted by exploding a miniature model of the station.

Similar to the work in Shaun of the Dead, blood and gore was prevalent throughout the film. Visual effects supervisor Richard Briscoe revealed the rationale for using the large amounts of blood: "In many ways, the more extreme you make it, the more people know it is stylised and enjoy the humour inherent in how ridiculous it is. It's rather like the (eventually) limbless Black Knight in [Monty Python and the Holy Grail]." The most time-consuming gore sequence involved a character's head being crushed by a section of a church. A dummy was used against a green screen and the head was detonated at the point when the object was about to impact the body. Throughout the film, over seventy gunfight shots were digitally augmented; Briscoe's rationale for adding the additional effects was that "The town square shootout, for example, is full of extra little hits scattered throughout, so that it feels like our hero characters really do have it all going off, all around them. It was a great demonstration of [how] seemingly very trivial enhancements can make a difference when combined across a sequence."

Promotion
The first two teaser trailers were released on 16 October 2006.  Wright, Pegg, and Frost maintained several video blogs, which were released at various times throughout the production of the film. Wright and Frost held a panel at the 2006 Comic-Con convention in San Diego, California to promote Hot Fuzz, which included preliminary footage and a question and answer session. The two returned to the convention again in 2007 to promote the US DVD release. Advance screenings of the film took place on 14 February 2007 in the UK and the world premiere was on 16 February 2007. The premiere included escorts from motorcycle police officers and the use of blue carpet instead of the traditional red carpet.

Release

Critical reception
Hot Fuzz received critical acclaim. The review aggregator website Rotten Tomatoes reported a 91% approval rating with an average rating of 7.7/10 based on 204 reviews. The website's consensus reads, "The brilliant minds behind Shaun of the Dead successfully take a shot at the buddy cop genre with Hot Fuzz. The result is a bitingly satiric and hugely entertaining parody." It has a Metacritic score of 81 out of 100, based on 37  critics, indicating "universal acclaim". Olly Richards of Empire praised the chemistry between Pegg and Frost, saying: "After almost a decade together, they're clearly so comfortable in each other's presence that they feel no need to fight for the punchline, making them terrific company for two hours". Philip French of The Observer, who did not care for Shaun of the Dead, warmed to the comedy team in this film. The film also received positive reviews in the United States. Derek Elley of Variety praised Broadbent and Dalton as "especially good as Angel's hail-fellow-well-met superior and oily No. 1 suspect". As an homage to the genre, the film was well received by screenwriter Shane Black.

Despite being mostly praised, not all reviews were positive. The Daily Mirror gave Hot Fuzz only 2/5, stating that "many of the jokes miss their target" as the film becomes more action-based. Anthony Quinn of The Independent said, "The same impish spirit [as in Spaced] is uncorked here, but it has been fatally indulged".

In 2016, Empire magazine ranked Hot Fuzz 50th on their list of the 100 best British films, with their entry stating, “the second in their planned trilogy again nails the genre clichés, with everything from Point Break to Bad Boys II (both openly referenced) humorously homaged. Pegg's natural chemistry with long-time real-life pal Frost remains endearing as ever. Elsewhere, the Scooby-Doo-meets-Scream mystery is peppered with Britain's finest talent, playing up the English small-town clichés to great effect in a brilliantly incongruous meeting of sleepy rural life and stabby violent action.”

Accolades

Box office
The film generated £7.1 million in its first weekend of release in the United Kingdom on 14 February 2007. In 20 April US opening weekend, the film grossed $5.8 million from only 825 cinemas, making it the highest per-cinema average of any film in the top ten that week. Its opening weekend take beat the $3.3 million opening weekend gross of Pegg and Wright's previous film, Shaun of the Dead. In its second weekend of release, Rogue Pictures expanded the film's cinema count from 825 to 1,272 and it grossed $4.9 million, representing a 17% dip in the gross. Altogether, Hot Fuzz grossed $80,573,774 worldwide. In nine weeks, the film earned nearly twice what Shaun of the Dead made in the US, and more than three times its gross in other countries.

Home media
The DVD was released on 11 June 2007 in the UK. Over one million DVDs were sold in the UK in the first four weeks of its release. The two-disc set contains the feature film with commentaries, outtakes, storyboards, deleted scenes, a making-of documentary, video blogs, featurettes, galleries, and some hidden easter eggs. The DVD also features Wright's last amateur film, Dead Right, which he described as "Hot Fuzz without the budget". Due to the above release date, the film arrived on region 2 DVD earlier than the theatrical release date in Germany on 14 June 2007. In the commentary with director Wright and fellow filmmaker Quentin Tarantino, they discuss nearly 200 films.

The US DVD and HD DVD release was on 31 July 2007. It opened at #2 at the American DVD sales chart, selling 853,000 units for over $14m in revenue. 1,923,000 units have been sold, acquiring revenue of $33.3 million. The HD DVD edition has more special features than the standard DVD release. A three-disc collector's edition was released on 27 November 2007 and a Blu-ray edition on 22 September 2009.

Soundtrack

The soundtrack album, Hot Fuzz: Music from the Motion Picture, was released on 19 February 2007 in the United Kingdom, and on 17 April 2007 in the United States and Canada. The UK release contains 22 tracks, and the North American release has 14. The film's score is by British composer David Arnold, who scored the James Bond film series from 1997 to 2008. The soundtrack album's "Hot Fuzz Suite" is a compilation of excerpts from Arnold's score. According to the DVD commentary, the scenes where Nicholas Angel is at a convenience store, while leaving Sandford, and his return to the police station while arming for the final shootout (found in the track "Avenging Angel"), were scored by Robert Rodríguez, who did not see the rest of the film while writing the music.

Other music from the film is a mix of 1960s and 1970s British rock (The Kinks, T. Rex, The Move, Sweet, The Troggs, Arthur Brown, Cozy Powell, Dire Straits), new wave (Adam Ant, XTC) and a Glaswegian indie band (The Fratellis). The soundtrack album features dialogue extracts by Pegg, Frost, and other cast members, mostly embedded in the music tracks. The song selection also includes some police-themed titles, including Supergrass' "Caught by the Fuzz" as well as "Here Come the Fuzz", which was specially composed for the film by Jon Spencer's Blues Explosion.

See also
 List of British films of 2007

References

External links

 
 
 
 
 
 The Director Interviews: Edgar Wright, Hot Fuzz at Filmmaker Magazine

2007 films
2007 action comedy films
2007 black comedy films
2000s buddy comedy films
2000s buddy cop films
2000s police comedy films
2000s parody films
2000s satirical films
2000s serial killer films
British action comedy films
British black comedy films
British buddy films
British buddy cop films
British parody films
British police films
British satirical films
British serial killer films
Films directed by Edgar Wright
Films produced by Eric Fellner
Films produced by Tim Bevan
Films with screenplays by Simon Pegg
Films with screenplays by Edgar Wright
Films scored by David Arnold
Films set in Gloucestershire
Films set in London
Films shot in London
Films shot in Somerset
Rogue (company) films
Relativity Media films
Working Title Films films
StudioCanal films
Wells, Somerset
Films about murder
2000s English-language films
2000s British films